The Codex Curiensis known also as Fragmenta Curiensia, designated by a2 or 16 (in Beuron system), is a 5th-century AD Latin manuscript of the New Testament. The text, written on vellum, is a version of the old Latin. The manuscript contains the fragments of the Gospel of Luke, on exactly two parchment leaves. 

It contains a fragments of the Gospel of Luke 11:11-29; 13:16-34. Pierre Batiffol was the first to suggest that these fragments belong to the same manuscript. They were first discovered by Hidber, professor of Berne, then described by E. Ranke.

The Latin text of the codex is a representative of the Western text-type in itala recension. 

Currently it is housed at the Rhätisches Museum (Clm 6436) in Chur.

See also 

 List of New Testament Latin manuscripts

References

Further reading 

 Irico, Sacrosanctus evangeliorum codex s. Eusebii Magni, Mailand  1748.
 Giuseppe Bianchini, Evangeliarium quadruplex Rom 1749.
 Ranke, Ein kleiner Italafund, Theol. Stud. und Kritiken, Gotha 1872, p. 505-520.
 Pierre Batiffol, Note sur un evangeliare de Saint-Gall, Paris 1884.
 A. Jülicher, Itala. Das Neue Testament in Altlateinischer Überlieferung, Walter de Gruyter, Berlin, New York, 1976.

Vetus Latina New Testament manuscripts
6th-century biblical manuscripts